The Cactus Motor Lodge, later known as the Cactus RV Park, was a motel located along historic U.S. Route 66 in Tucumcari, New Mexico. I.E. and Edna Perry built the lodge in 1941. The motel included three wings of units forming a "U" shape and an office, the latter of which was a dance hall when the motel opened. In 1952, Norm Wegner purchased the motel; Wegner added an artificial stone exterior to the buildings and converted the dance hall to an office. After Route 66 was decommissioned, the motel lost much of its business, and by the 1990s it became an RV park; the motel units fell into disuse. The motel's neon sign was restored in 2008. In October 2018, the sign was sold and removed to be relocated to an Albuquerque neon-sign park. Many other items were sold off before the owners sold the property itself to O'Reilly Auto Parts. O'Reilly razed all structures before beginning construction of their store at the location.

The motel was added to the National Register of Historic Places on March 21, 2006.

Gallery

See also

National Register of Historic Places listings in Quay County, New Mexico
List of motels

References

External links 

Hotel buildings on the National Register of Historic Places in New Mexico
Hotel buildings completed in 1941
U.S. Route 66 in New Mexico
Buildings and structures on U.S. Route 66
Hotels established in 1941
Motels in the United States
National Register of Historic Places in Quay County, New Mexico
Pueblo Revival architecture in New Mexico
1941 establishments in Kentucky
Demolished hotels in the United States
Demolished buildings and structures in New Mexico
Recreational vehicles
Tucumcari, New Mexico
Demolished but still listed on the National Register of Historic Places